Kaali is a 2018 Indian Tamil-language historical action film directed by Kiruthiga Udhayanidhi, starring Vijay Antony in the lead alongside Anjali, Sunaina, Shilpa Manjunath, and Amritha Aiyer. Produced by Fatima Vijay Antony, the film began production in March 2017 and was released on 18 May 2018. The film was dubbed and released in Hindi as Jawab the Justice.

Plot 
Bharath is a surgeon in America. Every time he sleeps, he gets a recurring dream about a bull chasing a baby and a woman's voice; this leaves him confused. When Bharath's mother goes into an emergency transplant surgery, he decides to be her donor. Still, his father reveals that it may not be possible because he is an adopted son. After his mother's successful surgery, Bharath goes to India to find out about his biological parents. Upon inquiry in the orphanage that he grew up in, he finds his mother's village and goes there. Bharath befriends villager Gopi, and they find that Bharath's mother's name is Parvathy, his actual name was Kaali, and she died trying to save him from a charging bull. Bharath assumes his given name Kaali, but when he asks about his father, nobody seems to know who he is, so he sets up a free clinic in the village and tries to do a DNA match test of all the patients who come there. The villagers line up to receive free treatment from him, and there is a sharp decrease in the number of patients coming to a local Siddha doctor named Valli. She becomes upset but later learns of Kaali's good nature.

Meanwhile, Kaali and Gopi have suspicions about the village head Periyasamy because he is left-handed, like Kaali. They get him drunk and ask about his past, where a young Periyasamy is in love with his college mate, but they face opposition from their parents due to caste differences. They plan to elope when they find that his girlfriend is pregnant, but due to problems at his house and communal riots in the village, Periyasamy arrives later than expected, and his girlfriend consumes poison and dies upon thinking that he had betrayed her. When Kaali asks his girlfriend's name, Periyasamy tells that she is Thenmozhi, and Kaali realizes that Periyasamy is not his father.

Later, in a brawl at a local bar, Kaali and Gopi come across a man named "Thala Vettiyaan" Maari, who has the name "Parvathy" tattooed on his arm. They try to find out about him, and he tells that the tattoo is the name of his girlfriend. A young Maari is a thief and goes to a house in the middle of the night to steal. He finds a woman named Parvathy trying to kill her abusive husband Gounder, who forcefully married her. Maari threatens Parvathy and steals money and jewels from her. Once Maari is out of the house, Parvathy follows him and tries to retrieve the stolen things, but he overpowers her. This incident blossoms into love between the two, and they try to elope to escape Gounder. Gounder finds out about the affair and orders his men to kill them. Parvathy dies while trying to save Maari. In a rage, Maari chops off Gounder's head, and this begins a communal riot in the village. Kaali now finds that Maari is also not his father.

In the meantime, the DNA test results come, and Kaali finds a match with an older woman named Vellathayee, who may be his grandmother. She tells that she had a daughter who worked in the church and died in a fire, and Kaali realizes that his mother is not Parvathy but Poomayilu. He is suspicious of Father John, a kindhearted person who has the respect of all the villagers. Kaali tries to match John's DNA and reads his personal diary, where he learns about his past. A young John comes to the village to become a Christian priest. He finds about the casteism in the village and that people are still being subjected to abuse. He abolishes the caste system and teaches the villagers to be united. Certain upper caste members object to this, and Gounder is one of them. His henchman Das thrashes John, and Poomayilu tends to John while he recovers. John grasps her hands, as she lies down in bed next to John, and they accidentally make love, as Poomayilu becomes pregnant. John repents to a priest and tries desperately to convince Poomayilu to elope with him and get married. Still, she refuses, saying that the whole village is united only because of John, and if he leaves now, they will go back to their old ways.

While this conversation happens, Das sets fire to all the lower caste community's huts in the wake of Gounder's murder committed by Maari. A communal riot begins, and many people die in the fire . Das is arrested and vows to take revenge on John. Poomayilu is also presumed to be dead. John becomes a priest and has been serving the village as per Poomayilu's wish since then. In reality, Poomayilu escaped the village without anyone's knowledge, had given birth to Kaali, and lived under a different identity as Parvathy until she died. Kaali now finds that his biological father is John and his DNA also matches to prove it. Das leaves jail and tries to kill John, but Kaali saves John and Das is killed. John thanks Kaali for his help. Kaali, however, chooses to hide the truth from John and let him continue his service to the community. He leaves the village since his mission is complete and takes along his grandmother and Valli with him to America.

Cast

Vijay Antony as Kaali (Dr.Bharath), Young Periyasamy (Samy), Young Maari, and Young John
Anjali as Valli
Sunaina as Poomayilu (Parvathy)
Shilpa Manjunath as Parvathy
Amritha Aiyer as Thenmozhi
Jayaprakash as Father John
Nassar as "Thala Vettiyaan" Maari
Madhusudhan Rao as Periyasamy (Samy)
Yogi Babu as Gopi
Vela Ramamoorthy as Gounder
R. K. Suresh as Das
Sreeja Ravi as Bharath's adopted mother
Ashok Pandian as Bharath's adopted father
Shanthi Mani as Vellathayee, Poo Mayilu's mother
Chitra Lakshmanan as Play Director
Jaya Rao as Periyasamy's father
R. S. G. Chelladurai as Old Man
Vazhakku Enn Muthuraman as Orphanage Manager

Production
In January 2017, it was reported that Vijay Antony would work on a project to be directed by Kiruthiga Udhayanidhi, who had earlier made Vanakkam Chennai (2013). In March, Vijay Antony confirmed that he would star and also produce the film, which was titled Kaali, with Kiruthiga revealing it would be a "family drama". Four actresses were cast in the film: Anjali, Sunaina, Amritha Aiyer, and Shilpa Manjunath.

After shooting for the film alongside his commitments in Srinivasan's Annadurai (2017), Vijay Antony chose to briefly prioritise his work for Kaali in April 2017, after Annadurais co-producer Raadhika underwent a tax raid on her properties. He later continued to shoot for both films simultaneously.

Soundtrack

The soundtrack of Kaali consists of five songs composed by Vijay Antony.

Critical reception

A Chennaivision reviewer wrote: "On the whole, the first half of Kaali is impressive and interesting. But things fail to impress us much in the second half. It is a mixed ride of positive and negative things." Ashameera Aiyappan of The Indian Express wrote, "Kaali would have been more effective had it been an anthology of three stories of estranged love set in late 1980s, where society plays the devil."

References

External links 

2018 films
2010s Tamil-language films
2018 action drama films
Indian action drama films
Indian historical action films
Films scored by Vijay Antony
Indian historical drama films